Hope Saddle ( above sea level) is a saddle located south of Richmond, in the Hope Range of the northern South Island. It lies above the Clark Valley.

In 1871 a track was cut over the Hope Saddle ensuring there was a route from Westport to Nelson. Horse-drawn vehicles began using the track in 1879. This track would become part of State Highway 6. The view from the Hope Saddle is regarded as being "magnificent".

References 

Mountain passes of New Zealand
Landforms of the Tasman District
State Highway 6 (New Zealand)